Andriy Pogrebnyak (born 11 February 1988) is a Ukrainian foil fencer, bronze medallist in the 2008 European Fencing Championships.

Pogrebnyak won the Ukraine national championship in 2013 and 2014.

References

External links
 
  (archive)

1988 births
Living people
Ukrainian male foil fencers
Sportspeople from Kyiv